Mazabuka Central is a constituency of the National Assembly of Zambia. It covers part of Mazabuka District in Southern Province, including the town of Mazabuka.

List of MPs

References 

Constituencies of the National Assembly of Zambia
1964 establishments in Zambia
Constituencies established in 1964